The 96th Regiment of Foot (British Musketeers) was an infantry regiment in the British Army from 8 April 1780 to 1784. It was one of several regiments raised in consequence of the American Revolutionary War.

The Colonel-Commandant of the regiment was General Richard Whyte. After serving for some time in Ireland the regiment was posted to the Channel Isles, where it was disbanded in 1784.

References

Infantry regiments of the British Army
Military units and formations established in 1780
Military units and formations disestablished in 1784
1780 establishments in England